Robert Alan Haber (born July 29, 1936) is an American activist. He was the first president of Students for a Democratic Society (SDS), a U.S. radical student activist organization. Haber was elected at the first meeting of SDS in 1960.  FBI files at the time indicated his official title as Field Secretary. Described variously at the time as "Ann Arbor's resident radical" and "reticent visionary", Haber organized a human rights conference in April of that year which "marked the debut of SDS" and invited four organizers of the 1960 NAACP sit-ins against segregated lunch counters in Greensboro, North Carolina.

Early life and education
Haber "came from a leftist background". His father William Haber, an economist, former dean and professor at the University of Michigan, was an "energetic" supporter of U.S. president Franklin D. Roosevelt's New Deal with socialist-progressive sympathies. Haber's parents named him after former Wisconsin governor, congressman and senator Robert M. La Follette Sr., advocate of the Wisconsin Idea political reforms in the late 19th century and early 20th century. Haber has one brother.

In 1954, Haber enrolled at the University of Michigan. He graduated in 1965.

Career
Haber's political activism began in the mid-1950s. He worked unsuccessfully to bring concert singer and blacklisted political activist Paul Robeson to University of Michigan campus; protested the firing of three U-M professors for their refusal to sign a loyalty oath; and picketed Ann Arbor Woolworth’s and Kresge’s stores for refusing to serve African Americans in the Jim Crow south.

Haber attended the National Student Association convention in Minneapolis in August 1960. There he witnessed a dramatic intervention by Sandra Cason (Casey Hayden) urging support for the fledgling Student Non-Violent Coordinating Committee (SNCC). She recalls that Haber "scooped" her up for the SDS, and that she in turn drew in Tom Hayden, editor of the University of Michigan newspaper. While collaborating with Haber, Hayden was the principal author of the Port Huron Statement, refined and adopted at the first Students for Democratic Society (SDS) convention in June 1962.

Haber was increasingly disaffected by the factionalism that marked the SDS as it mobilised on-campus opposition to the Vietnam War.  By 1969, after Haber had moved to Berkeley, Calif., SDS splintered with the Weather Underground faction turning to violence. Haber regretted that the movement had “turned very hard edged.

Haber makes a living as a cabinetmaker. Currently, he is working on the Megiddo Peace Project, and is involved with the revival of Students for a Democratic Society (2006 organization).

He helped found the Berkeley, California Long Haul Infoshop, an anarchist resource center and community space.

Personal life
Haber lives in Ann Arbor, Michigan with his partner Odile Hugonot-Haber.

References

External links 
 
 
 "Has Ann Arbor Lost its Liberal Mojo?", The Ann, October 2011

Living people
Members of Students for a Democratic Society
Haber, Robert Alan
University of Michigan alumni
American cabinetmakers
20th-century American Jews
Jewish activists
Place of birth missing (living people)
American political activists
American social activists
1936 births
21st-century American Jews